Koinotiko Chlorakas is the central stadium located in Chlorakas, Paphos in Cyprus. The first stadium had a capacity of 500 seats but after the renovation of 1983 the stadium increased its capacity to 3500. It is the home base of local team Akritas Chlorakas, a team consisting of Cypriot players mostly with the longest history in the city of Paphos.

Football venues in Cyprus
Buildings and structures in Paphos District